A macer is an officer who bears a ceremonial mace.

Macer is a Roman cognomen meaning "lean".
 Aemilius Macer was a Roman poet of the late Republic.
 Aemilius Macer (jurist) a Roman jurist of the third century AD.
 Quintus Baebius Macer, Roman senator of first and second centuries AD.
 Gaius Caesonius Macer Rufinianus, Roman military officer of the second century AD.
 Lucius Caesonius Lucillus Macer Rufinianus, Roman senator and military officer of the third century AD.
 Publius Calpurnius Macer Caulius Rufus, Roman senator of the second century AD.
 Lucius Clodius Macer was a legatus of the Roman Empire in Africa in the time of Nero.
 Gaius Licinius Macer (d. 66 BC), was an official and annalist of ancient Rome.
 Licinius Macer Calvus, Roman orator and poet of the first century BC.
 Martius Macer, Roman general who commanded a force of gladiators under Otho.

Also, Macer may refer to:
 Karlee Macer, Democratic member of the Indiana House of Representatives.
 Monica Macer, American writer and producer. 
 Reinald Macer (died 1213), Cistercian monk and bishop.
 Joe Macer, fictional character from the BBC soap opera EastEnders.
 Nick Macer, British nurseryman.
 Kate Macer, a character in the 2015 film Sicario, played by Emily Blunt
 Megan and Liz fans are called Macers